Mercy Watson is a series of chapter books written by Kate DiCamillo and illustrated by Chris Van Dusen.
Mercy Watson is the fictional pig who stars in the series.  Mercy Watson is called a "porcine wonder" by Mrs. and Mr. Watson. She loves toast and butter and really likes lots of butter on her toast.

Mercy Watson Goes for a Ride was a Theodor Seuss Geisel Honor Book in 2007 — one of three runners-up for the Geisel Award.

Seven Mercy Watson books were published from 2005 to 2022 by Candlewick Press of Somerville, Massachusetts.

Books

 Mercy Watson to the Rescue (2005)
 Mercy Watson Goes for a Ride (2006)
 Mercy Watson Fights Crime (2006)
 Mercy Watson, Princess in Disguise (2007)
 Mercy Watson Thinks Like a Pig (2008)
 Mercy Watson: Something Wonky This Way Comes (2009)
 A Very Mercy Christmas (2022)

Tales from Deckawoo Drive series
 Leroy Ninker Saddles Up (2014)
 Francine Poulet Meets the Ghost Racoon (2015)
 Where Are You Going, Baby Lincoln? (2016)
 Eugenia Lincoln and the Unexpected Package (2017)
 Stella Endicott and the Anything-Is-Possible Poem (2020)
 Franklin Endicott and the Third Key (2021)

Geisel Honor Book 
Mercy Watson Goes for a Ride was one of three Geisel Honor Books (runners-up for the Geisel Award) in 2007.

References

External links
 Leroy Ninker Saddles Up by DiCamillo and Van Dusen (Candlewick, forthcoming August 26, 2014) – featuring the horse Maybelline
 Chris Van Dusen, illustrator 
 

Children's fiction books
Books about pigs